(literally, "deer-frightening" or "boar-frightening"), in a wide sense, refers to Japanese devices made to frighten away animals that pose a threat to agriculture, including kakashi (scarecrows), naruko (clappers) and sōzu. In a narrower sense, it is synonymous with sōzu.

A sōzu is a type of water fountain used in Japanese gardens. It consists of a segmented tube, usually of bamboo, pivoted to one side of its balance point. At rest, its heavier end is down and resting against a rock. A trickle of water into the upper end of the tube accumulates and eventually moves the tube's centre of gravity past the pivot, causing the tube to rotate and dump out the water. The heavier end then falls back against the rock, making a sharp sound, and the cycle is repeated.

These fountains were originally intended to startle any herbivores, such as deer or boars, which might be grazing on the plants in the garden, but shishi-odoshi are now a part of the visual and aural design of gardens, and are used primarily for their aesthetic value.


Gallery

See also
Monjolo
Suikinkutsu
Water scoop (hydropower)
Tsukubai (a basin often used in conjunction)

References

External links 

 Information, diagram, and audio file

Japanese style of gardening